NBC Bearings is the brand of National Engineering Industries Limited (NEI), a part of the US$ 2.4 billion C K Birla Group, which manufactures a wide range of bearings for the automotive, industrial, aerospace and railways sector. The company had a gross turnover of Rs 1352 crores in 2013-14. NEI is capable of developing bearings from 6mm bore to 2000mm outer diameter, in over 2300 sizes. The company was founded by Mr B. M. Birla in 1946 in Jaipur, Rajasthan, India. Its products are exported to more than 30 countries across five continents.  Product range includes ball bearings, taper roller bearings, cylindrical bearings, spherical roller bearings, needle roller bearings, railway axle boxes and other special products. NEI also serves the Indian aftermarket through a countrywide network of 550 authorised stockists and thousand of retailers.

History 
National Bearings Company Limited (NBC) was founded in Jaipur by Shri B. M. Birla in a technical collaboration with Hoffman, UK in the year 1946. It began with the production of ball bearings from the year 1950. Following a political change in the princely state of Hyderabad, the company was renamed as National Engineering Industries Limited.

Facilities
The company has five manufacturing facilities located at Jaipur, Newai and Manesar and Savli (Vadodara). Apart from the bearing production, the company also produces Next- Gen products. The employee strength is 2800 across five plants.

Capacity
NBC makes 200 million bearings annually across its five plants. The NBC brand commands a market share of 24% in the domestic market. Approximately 70% of NEI's sales come from original equipment manufacturers and 30% from the replacement market. The turnover approximates 60% from the auto sector (OEM and aftermarket), 30% for railway products and 10% from the low volume industrial applications.

Technology 
NEI uses a heat treatment machine (furnace) from Chugairo, Japan. The grinding technology is sourced from Izumi of Japan, Nova of Italy, LMT of Sweden and FMT of Italy.  NEI operates 22 grinding lines out of which 17 are used for Deep Groove Ball Bearing (DGBB) and five are used for Double Row Angular Contact (DRAC) Bearings.  NEI maintains technical collaborations with NTN (Japan) and Amsted Rail (Brenco, USA).

Research and development
The company has developed a low torque bearing that can reduce friction up to 20%, which results in fuel efficiency. The company spends 1% of its turnover on R & D activities, with an eye on increasing it to 2% in the coming years. 

The company holds a number of patents born from its research activities.

See also
CK Birla Group
List of companies of India

References

 Manufacturing companies of India
 Companies based in Rajasthan
Economy of Jaipur
 CK Birla Group
 Indian brands
Indian companies established in 1946
Manufacturing companies established in 1946